Okazaki may refer to:

Okazaki (surname)
Okazaki, Aichi, a city in Japan
Okazaki Castle, a castle in Japan
Okazaki fragments, DNA fragments formed during DNA replication (biology)

See also
Okasaki